The National Intelligence Coordination Committee (NICC) of Pakistan is headed by the Director-General of Inter-Services Intelligence. The overarching intelligence coordination body was given assent by the Prime Minister of Pakistan Imran Khan in November 2020. It held its inaugural session on June 24, 2021, marking the date the committee became functional.

Background 
The Abbottabad Commission had recommended that a mechanism to integrate civil and military intelligence be set up. On November 24, 2020, Prime Minister Imran Khan approved the creation of the committee. On June 24, 2021, the body held its inaugural session at the Inter-Services Intelligence's headquarters. The meeting was presided over by Prime Minister Imran Khan and included Interior Minister Sheikh Rashid Ahmed, Information Minister Fawad Chaudhry, and the heads of the services’ intelligence agencies, specifically the Intelligence Bureau and Federal Investigation Agency.

Constituents 

Over two dozen intelligence organizations will coordinate under the NICC including:

 Inter-Services Intelligence
Intelligence Bureau
Federal Investigation Agency
Defense Intelligence:
Air Intelligence
Military Intelligence
Naval Intelligence
National Counter Terrorism Authority
Counter Terrorism Departments
CTD Punjab
CTD Khyber Pakhtunkhwa
CTD Sindh
CTD Balochistan
Financial Monitoring Unit
Directorate of Customs Intelligence and Investigation

Rangers Intelligence Wing
Rangers Intelligence Wing Punjab
Rangers Intelligence Wing Sindh
Field Intelligence Units Frontier Corps 
Field Intelligence Units Frontier Corps (South Khyber Pakhtunkhwa)
Field Intelligence Units Frontier Corps (North Khyber Pakhtunkhwa)
Field Intelligence Units Frontier Corps (South Balochistan)
Field Intelligence Units Frontier Corps (North Balochistan)
National Intelligence Directorate
Anti Narcotics Force
ANF Intelligence Wing
Pakistan Coast Guard 
PCG Intelligence Wing
Gilgit Baltistan Scouts
GB Scouts Intelligence Wing
Surveyor General of Pakistan
Directorate-General of Intelligence, Strategic Plans Division.

Current leadership

Permanent members

See also 
 List of intelligence agencies
 Pakistani intelligence community

References 

Pakistani intelligence agencies
Intelligence analysis agencies